The Urbana Daily Citizen is an American daily newspaper published in  Urbana, Ohio. It is owned by AIM Media Midwest.

The newspaper was part of the Brown Publishing Company chain that filed for Chapter 11 bankruptcy protection on April 30, 2010; its Ohio assets, including 14 daily newspapers and about 30 weeklies, were transferred to a new business, Ohio Community Media, which was purchased in May 2011 by Philadelphia-based Versa Capital Management.

In 2012 Versa merged Ohio Community Media, former Freedom papers it had acquired, Impressions Media, and Heartland Publications into a new company, Civitas Media. Civitas Media sold its Ohio papers to AIM Media Midwest in 2017.

References

External links 
 Urbana Daily Citizen
 Ohio Community Media

Newspapers published in Ohio
Urbana, Ohio
Champaign County, Ohio
Newspapers established in 1838
1838 establishments in Ohio